Kacper Adamski (born 19 March 1992) is a Polish handball player for Energa MKS Kalisz and the Polish national team.

References

1992 births
Living people
Sportspeople from Płock
Polish male handball players
Wisła Płock (handball) players
21st-century Polish people